Óscar Javier Méndez Albornoz (born 5 December 1994) is a Uruguayan professional footballer who plays as a midfielder for Independiente Medellín.

Career
Méndez's career began with Racing Club. He was an unused substitute six times under manager Rosario Martínez during the 2013–14 Uruguayan Primera División season, before making his professional debut on 2 November 2013 in a 1–0 win over Defensor Sporting. In total, Méndez made twenty appearances for Racing Club across his first three campaigns. He scored his first goal for them in November 2016 against River Plate at the Estadio Osvaldo Roberto. On 10 January 2019, Méndez completed a move to Argentine Primera División side Unión Santa Fe.

Career statistics
.

References

External links

1994 births
Living people
Uruguayan footballers
Uruguayan expatriate footballers
Footballers from Montevideo
Association football midfielders
Racing Club de Montevideo players
Unión de Santa Fe footballers
Danubio F.C. players
Independiente Medellín footballers
Uruguayan Primera División players
Uruguayan Segunda División players
Argentine Primera División players
Categoría Primera A players
Uruguayan expatriate sportspeople in Argentina
Uruguayan expatriate sportspeople in Colombia
Expatriate footballers in Argentina
Expatriate footballers in Colombia